Upper Canada College (UCC) is an independent day and boarding school for boys in Toronto, Ontario, operating under the International Baccalaureate program. The college is widely described as Canada's most prestigious preparatory school, and has produced many notable graduates. With around 1,200 students, UCC is highly selective, accepting approximately 15% of all applicants in 2019. The school has a generous financial aid program, with more than $5 million being awarded annually to Canadian citizens.

The secondary school segment is divided into ten houses; eight are for day students and the remaining two are for boarding students. Aside from the main structure, with its dominant clock tower, the Toronto campus has a number of sports facilities, staff and faculty residences, and buildings for other purposes. UCC also owns and operates an outdoor education campus in Norval, Ontario. It is the oldest independent school in the province of Ontario and the third oldest in Canada. 

UCC was founded in 1829 by Sir John Colborne, then Lieutenant Governor of Upper Canada, and modelled on Elizabeth College, Guernsey. After facing closure by the government on more than one occasion, UCC became fully independent in 1900, nine years after moving to its present location. Today, UCC is a fully independent school, with students and faculty from more diverse cultural and economic backgrounds. UCC maintains links with the Canadian royal family through its members or representatives of the monarch, sometimes serving as the college's Visitor and/or on its Board of Governors.

History

Beginnings and growth

UCC was founded in 1829 by Major-General Sir John Colborne (later Lord Seaton), then Lieutenant Governor of Upper Canada, in the hopes that it would serve as a feeder school to the newly established King's College (now known as the University of Toronto). UCC was modelled on the public schools of Great Britain, such as Eton College. Though now an independent school, the college was created with public funds, including an initial land grant of 6,000 acres of crown lands, later increased to 66,000 acres. The school began teaching in the original Royal Grammar School; however, within a year it was established on its own campus, known as Russell Square, at the north-west corner of King and Simcoe streets. Colborne brought educated men from the United Kingdom's Cambridge and Oxford Universities, attracting them with high salaries. Still, despite ever increasing enrolment, popularity with leading families of the day (both from the local Family Compact and from abroad); a visit in 1847 from the Governor General of the Province of Canada, the Earl of Elgin; and praise from many, including Charles Dickens, UCC was faced with closure on a number of occasions. Opponents of elitism sought to curtail provincial government funding and remove the college from its premises.

The school survived its critics; it merged with King's College for a period after 1831 and moved 60 years later to its present location in Deer Park, then a rural area. The school expanded in 1902 to take in lower year students with the construction of a separate primary school building, the Prep, allowing for boys to be enrolled from Grade Three through to graduation.

In 1900, the government of Ontario stopped funding UCC, making it a completely independent school. By 1910, however, UCC was facing declining enrolment and capital; it considered selling the Deer Park campus for $1.125 million and moving again to become a full boarding school on a property purchased in Norval, Ontario. Plans were halted by the outbreak of the First World War, and the college remained where it was. It eventually thrived there, both physically and culturally, as the buildings were expanded and bright instructors attracted.

Principal William Grant spearheaded further development. Shortly after assuming his position 1917, he oversaw recruitment of  teachers described as "eccentric, crotchety, quaint, though widely travelled and highly intelligent." His tenure also saw other improvements. Student enrolment doubled, and bursaries increased. Teacher salaries also doubled, and their benefits now included a pension plan.

UCC maintained a Cadet Corps from around 1837, which became a rifle company attached to the Volunteer Militia Rifles of Canada (later The Queen's Own Rifles of Canada) in 1860 and the one of two student corps called to duty in Canadian military history when it assisted in staving off the Fenian Raids in 1866. (The other one being Bishop's College School No.2 Cadet Corps) Through the two World Wars, a number of UCC graduates gave their lives and provided leadership; historian Jack Granatstein, in his book The Generals, demonstrated that UCC graduates accounted for more than 30 per cent of Canadian generals during the Second World War, and 26 Old Boys achieved brigadier rank or higher. A war memorial display case and plaque in the Upper School's main entrance hall is dedicated to the UCC Old Boys who distinguished themselves during Canadian military service periods.

After the Second World War

UCC faced a major crisis when, in 1958, it was discovered that the main building was (due to poor construction) in danger of collapse. At the time, despite its benefactors, UCC had no endowment. An emergency building fund was started within the year and, with the assistance of Prince Philip, all of the necessary $3,200,000 was raised from Old Boys and friends of the college; Ted Rogers' contribution paid for the clock tower while Robert Laidlaw donated the funds necessary for construction of Laidlaw Hall. Construction of the present main building began in early 1959 and it was opened by former governor general Vincent Massey near the end of 1960. The crisis forced the school government to rethink their stance on foresight and planning, leading to a years-long program of new construction, salary improvements, and funding sources. Further, in teamwork with Principal Sowby, whom he had helped select, Massey had further influence on the college, bringing about somewhat of a renaissance for the school: A number of distinguished visitors were brought in and leading minds were hired as masters. At this time, the curriculum began to shift from offering a classical education to offering one grounded in the liberal arts; language options besides Latin were first offered after 1950.

1965 to 1975 was a decade of constant change at UCC; global and local cultural influences such as the Vietnam War, the bohemian Yorkville neighbourhood, the Woodstock festival, changing fashion trends, rock bands, and Watergate, collided head-on with the conservative and traditional culture and environment at UCC. Individual freedoms trumped institutional discipline and moral authority had lost its clout. Patrick T. Johnson, principal from 1965 to 1974, managed the cultural transition during these years, successfully integrating societal trends, traditional values, and individual self-expression. One of the casualties, though, was the cadet corps; it was disbanded in September 1975 in favour of a smaller volunteer corps. Under principals educated at Oxford (Johnson) and Cambridge (Sadlier), the college refused to adopt the new provincial educational standards issued in 1967, which it considered lower than the old standards. UCC also moved forward with new educational and athletic facilities across the campus, while opening the campus to the wider community at the same time. By the 1990s, summer camps were set up on the campus for any child who wished to enroll.

The college embarked on another building campaign, again with the aid of Prince Philip, beginning in 1989 and ending in 1994, with the construction of new athletic facilities at the Upper School and the replacement of the 1901 Peacock Building at the Prep. Two years later, UCC adopted the International Baccalaureate (IB), which augmented the Ontario Secondary School Diploma. Following this, Grade Two was added in 1998 and Grade One the next year. Since 2003, UCC has offered places from Senior Kindergarten to Grade Twelve.

Into the 21st century
In the years following 1998, five UCC staff were accused of sexual abuse or of possessing child pornography; three were convicted of some of the charges against them. In 2003, 18 students launched a $62 million class-action lawsuit against UCC, claiming sexual abuse by Doug Brown, who taught at the Prep from 1975 to 1993 and was eventually found guilty in 2004 of nine counts of indecent assault and sentenced to three years in prison. UCC agreed to a settlement with the victims, the terms of which cannot be disclosed.

UCC followed the trends in environmentalism when the Board of Governors unanimously voted in 2002 to establish the Green School initiative, wherein environmental education would become "one of the four hallmarks of a UCC education." Plans to carry this out saw not only upgrades of the school's physical plant to meet environmentally sustainable standards, but also an integration of these new initiatives into the curriculum. After the appointment in 2004 of Jim Power as principal, the curriculum further evolved to address reports of wider, societal trends showing a rise in boys' behavioural problems and a decline in their educational performance. Simultaneously, UCC's status as an all-boys school found support following years of pressure to become co-educational, especially as other prominent, formerly all-boys schools in Ontario began to make the switch, such as Lakefield College School (1989), Appleby College (1991), and Trinity College School (1991).

As part of the strategic plan for the school, the board of governors decided in 2007 to close the 180-year-old boarding programme, citing market changes and the neglect of boarding over preceding decades—saying it had been for too long "too broken to be excellent, but not broken enough to fix". However, students, the Old Boy community, and others associated with UCC reacted negatively to the announcement, leading the board to revisit its earlier conclusion. The determination was boarding should be retained, but, only if it, among other requirements, housed no less than 60 students, the facilities were improved (work that took place through the summers of 2013 and 2014), and boarders be drawn from across the country.

Campus and facilities

Toronto campus

Upper Canada College occupies an open, 17 hectare (43 acre) campus in Deer Park, near the major intersection of Avenue Road and St. Clair Avenue, in the residential neighbourhood of Forest Hill. There are 15 buildings on the site:

The main structure (the Upper School), constructed between 1959 and 1960, central on the campus, and with a dominant clock tower, houses the secondary school component of the college, in a quadrangle form. Laidlaw Hall, the principal assembly hall, featuring a full theatre stage and a pipe organ, is attached to the west end of the Upper School and, at the other end, is the Memorial Wing, the school's main infirmary. Closing the north end of the main quadrangle (which is the location of the statue of the Lord Seaton, installed in 1934) is one building, built in 1932, that contains the two boarding houses, as well as two private residences for the associated boarding masters, adjacent to which is the school chapel, donated by Governor General Vincent Massey.

Satellite to this complex are townhouse-style residences for masters and their families; the residence of the college's principal, Grant House, built in 1917; and a small, two-storey cricket pavilion, inaugurated by Governor General Ramon Hnatyshyn. The Preparatory School, part of which was designed by Eden Smith, is at the south-west corner of the campus, near which is a home for the Prep headmaster and a small gatehouse.

The athletic facilities include an indoor pool and three gymnasiums, as well as, around the campus, the William P. Wilder sports complex (containing an NHL and an Olympic sized hockey rink, one of only four in Ontario), a sports activity bubble, tennis courts, a sports court, a running track, and nine regulation sized sports fields. The two major fields of the Upper School are called Commons and Lords, after, respectively, the British House of Commons and House of Lords, and one of the main central fields is known as the Oval (covered in winter by a bubble). In the summer of 2006, the latter, along with the encompassing running track, was renovated, with the grass replaced by a partially synthetic astroturf/grass hybrid and the track paved with a rubber turf. Several metres below the field, geothermal pipes were laid to provide alternative energy heating for both the Upper School and the adjacent sports complex. A number of these facilities are the result of a decade long, $90 million capital building campaign launched in the 1990s. Still planned are an Olympic-standard, 50-metre swimming pool; a new racquet centre for squash, badminton, and tennis; a rowing centre; the expansion of both the Prep and Upper School academic buildings; and an expansion of the archives.

The Ontario Heritage Trust, a non-profit agency of the Ontario Ministry of Culture, erected three plaques outlining UCC's presence and history in Toronto. One is on the north-east corner of 20 Duncan Street (the only existing building from the college's original campus), the second at the south-east corner of 212 King Street West, and one at the main entrance of the current campus at 200 Lonsdale Road. (An additional plaque that mentions Upper Canada College stands in Clarence Square, commemorating Alexander Dunn, an Old Boy who received Canada's first Victoria Cross.)

Norval campus
The land was used by First Nations as camping and hunting grounds and Huron and Iroquois travelled along the Credit to Lake Ontario to trade with Europeans. By the early 19th century, the land supported farming; many remnants of this use remain, including apple orchards and artifacts, some of which were unearthed by students during simulated archaeological digs.

Norval's main purpose is to teach college students about the natural environment, sustainability, and ecosystems through outdoor learning programs, some in conjunction with Outward Bound Canada. It is staffed by five full-time teachers, a superintendent, and cooks and housekeepers. Throughout the school year, entire classes, houses, or portions of certain grades will have a several day stay at Norval and other Ontario schools use the property and its facilities during the weeks when UCC students are not in residence. Norval also hosts an open house each season, with the spring Maple Madness focusing on the site's traditional maple syrup manufacturing, as well as cross-country skiing in winter and pumpkin carving in the autumn.

The land was purchased in 1913, at a time when the city of Toronto was quickly growing around the college's Deer Park campus and the trustees were considering moving the school to a new location. Plans for buildings were drawn up by an architectural firm. However, due to the outbreak of the First World War and then the depression, the move was fully abandoned in the 1930s. The college first attempted to sell the land in 1928 and again in 1935, but found no buyers. Eventually, the property was developed into an outdoor education centre for UCC students and community. Beginning in 1913, an annual picnic was held at Norval, the first being catered by the King Edward Hotel. As the land had originally been cleared for agricultural use, much of the site was open field until over 700,000 seedlings were planted by staff and students through the 1940s, followed by the creation of an arboretum in 1962. The first bunk house was built in the 1930s and augmented in 1967 by another, larger residence and dining building known as Stephen House, which won a Massey Medal for excellence in architecture for the designer, Blake Millar. Stephen House contains a classroom and laboratory, in addition to the residential spaces for students and staff. There is also a bungalow-style residence for the property caretaker and in 2003 several log cabins were built for writing retreats.

Into the 2000s, the school came under criticism for keeping the entirety of the increasingly taxed Norval property while so little of it was actually used; this argument has gained increased credence in light of the consistent yearly tuition hikes and mounting legal costs. Despite repeated assertions that the college had no intention of selling the property, citing not only rapidly increasing land value, but also an intention to hold it to prevent industrial development on land that contains a variety of wildlife, including spotted deer and hares, UCC sold a small portion of the acreage in 2007 to help cover costs related to the 2003 class action lawsuit brought against the school by former students. In 2011, the Norval Long-Range Planning Committee recommended that Norval's facilities should be expanded to allow for more overnight students and co-educational use.

Tuition, scholarships, and assets

Upper Canada College is Canada's wealthiest independent school, having an endowment of more than CA$100 million. For the 2020–2021 school year, tuition fees range from $34,135 to $37,135 (not including a $8,500 initial registration fee, books and uniform) for day students and $61,085 to $66,835 for boarders (not including a $5,000 initial registration fee). An additional $500 technology fee is levied on all students in the Upper School, which covers the costs of a MacBook Air laptop computer, the associated software, and technological support. According to the school, less than two per cent of the Canadian population can afford the full cost of attending the school. The institution has strict admissions standards, accepting approximately 20 per cent of all applicants for the 2018–2019 school year. The college began a fundraising campaign in 2012 to obtain $100 million for scholarships; a donation of $11 million was received from Stu Lang, the largest single gift in Canadian independent school history. To honour Lang's donation, UCC created the Lang Scholar Program to recognize up to 15 student-athletes annually with extraordinary leadership potential. UCC disbursed over $5.0 million in financial aid in 2019 to approximately 20 per cent of students. Only students in grade five and above are eligible for this assistance.

Besides its own archives containing records that outline the history of Upper Canada, the province of Ontario, and the city of Toronto dating back to the mid-19th century, the college also has a notable collection of artwork, antiques, and war medals. This includes the Order of Canada insignia presented to Robertson Davies, Foster Hewitt, Charles Band, and Arnold Smith, plus Canada's first Victoria Cross, awarded in 1854 to Old Boy Alexander Roberts Dunn, and the Victoria Cross given, and ceremonial sword belonging, to Hampden Zane Churchill Cockburn; the valour medals were given to the Canadian War Museum on permanent loan on 17 May 2006. In the college's chapel, itself decorated with works by Canadian artists, is an altar made of marble from parts of St. Paul's Cathedral, in London, England, that were damaged in the Blitz and donated by Dean of St. Paul's Walter Robert Matthews. On this is an altar cloth made from a piece of that which was used for the coronation of Queen Elizabeth II. Held is an American flag that flew atop one of the World Trade Center towers in New York City. Further, the school holds works by Thoreau MacDonald and a collection of original paintings from the Group of Seven (though several were auctioned by the college in an effort to pay for the lawsuits it faced in 2004); an original Stephen Leacock essay, titled Why Boys Leave Home—A Talk on Camping, donated in 2005 and published for the first time in The Globe and Mail; and the original manuscript of Robertson Davies' work The Mask of Aesop, which he wrote in 1952 specifically for the Prep's 50th anniversary. Also in UCC's possession is a chair owned by Sir John A. Macdonald and another that once belonged to George Airey Kirkpatrick.

Governance, faculty, and staff
Upper Canada College is incorporated under an act of the Legislative Assembly of Ontario and administered by a 17-member Board of Governors as a public trust, with the current chair of the board being Russ Higgins, a principal of MacPherson Builders ltd. Somerset Entertainment. The board, whose members are appointed and elected from alumni, parents of students past and present, and the wider UCC community, selects the college's principal, who serves for five years, managing the school's annual operation and heading an executive committee composed of vice-principals, department heads, and administration staff. There are also a number of other committees for advancement, finance and audit, governance and nominating, human resources, long range planning, property, and senior management review. Additionally, the UCC Foundation, a registered charity in Ontario since 1962 and run by a board of trustees, manages the school's endowment. Honorary trustees include David R. Beatty, John Craig Eaton II, Hans Michael Jebsen, Michael MacMillan, Kelly and Michael Meighen, Richard M. Thomson, Galen Weston, and Michael Wilson.

There are 129 faculty members in total, of whom 12 possess doctorates, 40 hold master's degrees, and 20 per cent are International Baccalaureate examiners. 17 faculty members reside on the campus. The student-to-teacher ratio is 18:1 in the lower grades and 19:1 in the upper grades.

Visitor

Sir John Colborne served informally as Upper Canada College's first visitor. When the post was created in 1833, the Bishop of York was named as the occupant, ex officio. Four years later, an act of the Upper Canada legislature outlined that the Visitors of UCC would be the judges of His Majesty's Court of King's Bench. The role was then transferred in 1850 to the Governor General of the Province of Canada, on behalf of Queen Victoria, until Confederation, after which the Lieutenant Governor of Ontario acted as Visitor. However, it was later felt the provincial viceroy was connected too much to politics and the office of Visitor was not mentioned in the 1901 act that altered the government of UCC.

Victoria's great-grandson, Prince Edward, Prince of Wales (later Edward VIII and then Duke of Windsor), was in 1920 appointed as Upper Canada College's official Visitor, at the Prince's request. The College Times wrote then:

It will be a great pleasure to all to hear that the HRH the Prince of Wales has expressed a wish to be given the fine old English title of Visitor of this school. HRH met so many "Old Boys" while [fighting in World War I] that when he made his visit to Canada last year he instituted special inquiries about the previous history of the College. Finding that the title existed, he has thus honored us by becoming "Visitor of Upper Canada College".... The gracious offer of the Prince, places the position on a still higher plane, and it makes us all feel a lot prouder of the grand old College to which we belong.

Maintaining a connection with the Canadian royal family, Prince Philip, Duke of Edinburgh (husband of Edward VIII's niece, Queen Elizabeth II), was appointed as Visitor of UCC in 1955, a role in which he served until his death in 2021. He visited the college five times while he was Visitor, aided two fundraising campaigns, and gave items to the school, including a signed cricket bat.

In May 2012, the Upper Canada College Monarchist League conducted a poll and submitted to the Board of Governors a report outlining how 71 per cent of students surveyed (91 per cent of those in Year One) approved of another member of the royal family serving as UCC's Visitor upon the resignation or demise of the Duke of Edinburgh. It was recommended that the next person to occupy the post be non-partisan and of a young age, so as to be likely to serve for a number of decades, as the Duke of Edinburgh had done. The most widely supported figure was Prince Philip's grandson, Prince William, Duke of Cambridge.

Student body
UCC is a non-denominational school with approximately 1,000-day students and 88 boarders; Senior Kindergarten to Grade Seven students, approximately 400 boys, attend the Preparatory School (the Prep), after which a boy may move on to the Upper School, which consists of Grades Eight to Twelve. The Upper School years are known as follows:

 Grade Eight: Year Eight (formerly called Year One)
 Grade Nine: Year Nine (formerly called Year Two)
 Grade Ten: Year Ten (formerly called Foundation Year)
 Grade Eleven: Year Eleven (formerly called IB1)
 Grade Twelve: Year Twelve (formerly called IB2)

While Prep students are divided into forms, UCC, like several other schools in the Commonwealth of Nations, divides its Upper School students into houses. The house system was first adopted in 1923, consisting of only four houses until the late 1930s, after which the number increased the present ten. Eight of these—Bremner's, Howard's, Jackson's, Martland's, McHugh's, Mowbray's, Orr's, and Scadding's—are for day students and the remaining two—Seaton's and Wedd's—are for boarders. The houses compete in an annual intramural competition for the Prefects' Cup and the boarders also take part in weekend events and trips with boarders from neighbouring girls' schools.

Martland's was named for John "Gentle" Martland, a master at the College who was most well known for his reform of the boarding houses, making them into something more than simple residences. He toned down the rigid study regimes, cold dormitories, bland menus, and bullying, fostering instead more tolerating discipline, swift punishment for serious offenders, the occasional feast, and organised recreation. Wedd's is the one the oldest of the ten houses at UCC and is named for William Wedd, formerly first classical master.

The school's student government, created in 1892 and known as the Board of Stewards, represents the students at events, such as Association Day and Winterfest, and relays their wishes, during times of change or concern, to the upper administration. The group comprises 17 elected members of the Leaving Class: one steward for each house (the heads of houses) plus seven—the Head Steward and six stewards with portfolio—chosen by the majority of the whole student body. In addition to the stewards, students can enter the prefects program, requiring them to show leadership through their senior years to be awarded the title of Prefect upon graduation, the highest recognition UCC offers "for citizenship and leadership."

Though Upper Canada College has accepted ethnic minorities since the first black student (Peter Gallego, the son of a former American slave) enrolled in 1831 and First Nations boys, such as Francis Assikinack (son of the Ojibwe leader Jean-Baptiste Assiginack) in 1840, their representation within the student body was initially disproportionate to the same within the city's population and the school developed a reputation as a "WASP bastion". Michael Ignatieff considered the school's ethnic makeup during his time there, between 1959 and 1965, reflective of the culture of Toronto in general; according to him, "basically Tory, Anglican and fantastically patrician." Peter C. Newman, who attended UCC a decade before Ignatieff, and himself Jewish, said anti-semitism was "virtually non-existent." According to school historian Richard Howard, UCC transformed its culture during the 1970s, as it began to offer assistance to the less affluent and made attempts to attract boys from visible minorities, becoming what he called "a small United Nations" that echoed Toronto's emerging ethnic variety (today, students from over 20 different countries and regions attend UCC), though, as recently as 1990, there were references in College Times editorials to anti-semitism and sexism. These aspects of college life came to light in 1994, through James T. Fitzgerald's book Old Boys, which published some alumni's recollections of the school. In it, Peter Dalglish noted that while the student body was more racially diverse, it was still predominantly populated by the upper middle class, with the Asian students being even wealthier than their white counterparts. The college took the criticisms seriously, hiring Dalglish to help open UCC to the broader community. The decision to reverse the 2007 plan to eliminate boarding was made in part because of boarding's inherent ability to allow students from around the world to attend UCC. The college's expansion of financial aid beginning in 2012 was intended to socioeconomically diversify the student body.

Curriculum
Upper Canada College educates boys from Senior Kindergarten through to Grade Twelve. Graduates receive both the Ontario Secondary School Diploma and the International Baccalaureate (IB) diploma; UCC adopted the IB program in 1996 and the entire curriculum is today guided by the non-governmental organization. French, language, mathematics, science, outdoor education, physical education, the arts, and more are covered during a boy's years in the Prep School and, once boys move to the Upper School in Year One (Grade Eight), they begin university preparation through a liberal arts program. The courseload includes mathematics, history, geography, science, English, second languages, civics, design, film and the dramatic, visual, and musical arts, as well as computer science. Aiding both student and teachers is the Wernham West Centre for Learning, the most comprehensive and endowed secondary school learning facility in Canada. Created in 2002 as a department pertaining to the refinement of academic skills and assisting the students with learning disabilities, its primary focus is to facilitate improved learning skills and abilities, as well as accommodate for students with particular learning disabilities.

Extracurricular activities
Participation in extracurricular activities is encouraged at Upper Canada College; all students are required to complete 40 hours of Community Service as a part of their Ontario Secondary School Diploma as well as complete 150 hours of other extracurricular commitments, with an equal division between arts, athletics, and community service (what the IB calls CAS: creativity, action, service), prior to graduation.

Arts and athletics
Upper Canada College runs a variety of extracurricular theatre programs, ranging in scope and scale, from musicals to Shakespeare, with at least one large-scale and one small-scale production each year. Smaller, student written and run plays are also produced. The theatre program, which includes all aspects of production, is run in conjunction with Bishop Strachan School, a nearby girls' private school. Various bands and music groups that practice extra-curricularly are also supported by the college, including a wind ensemble, concert band, stage band, string ensemble, jazz ensemble, and singers. These groups compete in festivals at different levels and also organize fundraising concerts. UCC has sports rivalries with other boys' schools in Ontario.

Sports teams run by UCC include baseball, basketball, cricket, football, golf, hockey, rowing, rugby, lacrosse, soccer, squash, Swimming, Track and Field, tennis, and volleyball. Some teams are purely intramural, but 45 interscholastic teams compete in the CISAA and OFSAA and regularly place high in the standings at national and international competitions, such as the Head of the Charles Regatta.

Programs
The World Affairs Conference is Canada's oldest student run conference, begun in 1983 and organized in conjunction with Branksome Hall since the late 1980s. Held annually, the Conference has reached over 4,000 students, 25 countries, and 65 schools around the world. Past speakers have included Mehdi Hasan, Ralph Nader, Stephen Lewis, Michael Ignatieff, Susan Faludi, Gwynne Dyer, Thomas Homer-Dixon, and Edward Snowden, all of whom have spoken on a variety of topics including human rights, gender issues, justice, globalization, and health ethics.  The conference has also received letters of support from both the Mayor of Toronto and the Prime Minister of Canada.  The Executives of WAC for the 2022-2023 school year are: Jefferson Ding (Conference Chair), Rahul Nanda (Conference Chair), John Voudouris (Head of Plenaries), Alan Xu (Head of Keynotes and Panels), Cole Herman (Head of Programs), Ian McCreadie (Head of SPRINT), Ian Ye (Head of Marketing), Aaron Ratnavel (Head of Registration), Jack Guilfoyle (Head of Facilities), Rohin Arya (Head of Technology), Carson Berall (Head of Finance), Ray Wu (Head of Productions), Nicolas Albornoz (Head of Design), and Will Morgenstern (Head of Security).

In conjunction with other schools, UCC ran the Ontario Model Parliament (OMP), a simulation of a provincial parliament that started in 1986, when it was founded by UCC teacher Paul Bennett, and was composed of two events: an Elections Day at UCC, followed by a three-day simulation that took place in the legislative chamber at the Legislative Assembly of Ontario. UCC students made up the entirety of the Executive Committee that organizes and runs the model parliament, however 200 students from high schools around the province participated. Past Elections Day speakers have included Art Eggleton, John Tory, John Aimers, Bob Rae, and Rex Murphy.  As of 2015, OMP has been replaced by OMUN, a Model UN conference now led by UCC students sometimes in conjunction with the Bishop Strachan School and Branksome Hall.  OMUN hosts around 400–500 delegates annually and has multiple international delegations present.  UCC hosts 50–100 clubs (depending on the term), with Model UN and DECA being among the most popular.

The UCC Green School is an environmental organization composed of student, teachers, and faculty, through which UCC has planted and maintained an educational organic garden, reduced landfill waste and water consumption, and implemented a program of purchasing renewable resources for renovations. The Green School has won awards from the City of Toronto and the National Audubon Society.

Media
The College maintains and administers its own publishing company, the UCC Press, which produces all school publications. It also once printed professional texts, novels, and histories, such as those by Robert Lowell, but the UCC Press today prints the majority of school-related publications—newspaper, alumni magazines, financial reports, etc.—save for the College Times. UCC provides several publications, most of which are written, directed, and printed by students.
The College Times is UCC's yearbook and is the oldest school publication in Canada, having been issued without fail since it was founded by John Ross Robertson, then a student at UCC, in September 1857. The first editions were written by Robertson and fellow pupils and printed on presses at The Globe, the predecessor newspaper of the present The Globe and Mail. Past editors include Robertson Davies, Michael Ignatieff, and Stephen Leacock. Issued more regularly,  Upper Canada College also has an online publication, The Blue and White (TBAW, tbaw.ca) to which students submit articles about school life and current affairs. TBAW was founded in 2011 by William Hall. Old Times is the school's alumni magazine, which reports on the lives of Old Boys, and highlights recent and upcoming events.

Serials for the student body include The Blazer, the college humour newspaper; Quiddity, the school's annual arts and literature publication, which showcases students' creative work; The Blue Page, a one-page weekly publication of letters to the editor expressing opinions on any relevant issue; and Convergence, the school's award-winning student newspaper. In addition, BluesTV was a student-led, school television network that started in 2007 and aired multimedia, slideshows of pictures from various school events, as well as promotional material created for the college. BluesTV became a subsidiary of the Media Association in 2009, fostering the operation of a live-announcement submission and display system.

Community service
Upper Canada College encourages students to engage in voluntary community service. In relation to this, the college runs the Horizons program, in which local underprivileged children are tutored in music, digital media, and academics twice a week by current UCC students. Further, each year, usually for two to four weeks during Spring Break, UCC also organises trips for 15 to 20 of its Upper School students to various developing countries where they take part in community building services such as constructing schools, wells and homes, or aiding in conservation work. Students have ventured to places like Venezuela, El Salvador, Kenya, and China.

Events
Every year the school plans and runs several on or off-site events, some of which are open only to students in certain years, while others to the entire student population, alumni, and their respective friends and family. These events are intended to serve a variety of purposes—promoting school spirit, for enjoyment, fund raising or philanthropic causes—and many are organized by the Upper Canada College Association, with the help of parent and student volunteers.

Association Day is analogous to UCC's homecoming. Held since 1979, A-Day, as it is informally known, constitutes the school's largest annual event, taking place over the last weekend of September and culminating on the Saturday with a large festival, including competitive matches for all fall sports teams and the Association Dinner for Old Boys celebrating their five-year incremental class reunions. Later in the academic year is the Founder's Dinner, a formal event that has been held for more than a century. It typically takes place on the Thursday night before the third weekend in January, which is made a special long weekend for students as a commemoration of Sir John Colborne's birthday. Another regular event is the UCC Gala, a black tie dinner and silent auction organized every three or four years in May.

Two secondary school student dances take place in the calendar year: The Battalion Ball originated out of the At Home, a UCC community-wide event similar to a modern homecoming and first held in 1887. The revival of the UCC Rifle Corps in 1891 resulted in students attending the At Home in their cadet uniforms and, by 1897, a dance was added to the festivities in the evening, known as the Rifle Corps Dance. By 1931, the dance became the Battalion Ball, after the Rifle Corps was renamed the UCC Cadet Battalion, and, in 1971, the colloquial nickname The Batt was devised, which later developed into "Batt Ball". The event was held off-campus for the first time in 1975, at the Royal York Hotel, and, after 1976, when the Cadet Corps was disbanded, school uniforms replaced military attire, rock bands played, and Batt Ball became more of a spring prom. Today, Batt Ball is reserved for students in grades 11 and 12, held at venues such as the Royal York Hotel or Arcadian Court, with attire being tuxedo for boys and evening gown or cocktail dress for girls, and music is provided by DJs. The Stewards' Dance is UCC's fall semi-formal and is typically fashioned around costume party themes such as "Great Couples in History". The dance takes place in late October and is administrated by the Board of Stewards for all students in grades 11 and above.

Various sporting events occur annually: Hockey Night has been held by the college since 1933 as an evening where the First Hockey team would play a feature game against one of UCC's rival schools in competition for the Foster Hewitt Victory Trophy. The game was held at Maple Leaf Gardens, thanks to the generosity of the arena's builder, Conn Smythe, and its (as well as the then Toronto Maple Leafs) owner, Harold Ballard, both themselves Old Boys. After the closing of The Gardens in 2000, the event was moved to the Air Canada Centre and then the Ricoh Coliseum. Over the decades other games were added to the roster, including a game involving the school's Junior Varsity team, the final game of the house hockey tournament, and a game between Havergal College and Bishop Strachan School. By the early 1990s, pleasure skating and Prep School games had been added to the evening's schedule. Further, the Terry Fox Run is one of Upper Canada College's most successful events; the school is an official site for the run, acting as the start and end point, as well as part of the course, which ventures throughout Toronto's Belt-Line. UCC's Terry Fox Run is also the largest site and has raised the most money in the world since 2000. The Prep Games Day is an annual held event at the junior school.

Affiliations
Upper Canada College is a member of the Conference of Independent Schools of Ontario (CIS), the Canadian Accredited Independent Schools (CAIS), the Secondary School Admission Test (SSAT) Board, the G30 Schools, the Association of Boarding Schools (TABS) and an associate member of the National Association of Independent Schools (NAIS), the International Boys' Schools Coalition (IBSC), the Toronto Boys' School Coalition (TBSC), and the college principal is a member of the Headmasters' and Headmistresses' Conference (HMC) in the UK. Along with St. Andrew's College, Ridley College, and Trinity College School, UCC also remains one of the Little Big Four, an athletic association of Ontario independent boys' schools established in the 19th century.

Bishop Strachan School (BSS) is located only two blocks from UCC, it is UCC's sister school. UCC students  work on joint projects with students of other nearby girls' schools, including BSS, St. Clement's School, Havergal College, and Branksome Hall.

The school had, between 2008 and 2009, a relationship with an Ontario Junior Hockey League team, the Upper Canada Hockey Club, though the team and the school were not directly affiliated. Upper Canada College is also a member of the Ontario Tennis Association.

UCC community

Alumni

The college states that almost every UCC graduate, known as an Old Boy, goes on to post-secondary schooling, though some will take a sabbatical; Peterson's reported in 2010 that of 150 graduating students, 143 went on to college or university. The graduate community consists of over 6,000 Old Boys around the world and, though the career paths of the college's alumni are varied, UCC has a reputation for educating many prominent and notable graduates.

The school has produced six lieutenant governors, four premiers, seven chief justices, and four Mayors of Toronto. At least 17 graduates have been appointed to the Queen's Privy Council for Canada, 26 have been named Rhodes Scholars, five have been named Loran Scholars, 10 are Olympic medallists, and at least 13 have been accepted as fellows of the Royal Society of Canada. No less than 41 have been inducted into the Order of Canada since the honour's inception in 1967 and 11 into the Order of Ontario.

Faculty

Notable faculty members of Upper Canada College have included:
 George Anthony Barber – Toronto's first school superintendent and founder of the Toronto Cricket Club
 Michael Barrett – Physician and proponent and first Dean of the Ontario Medical College for Women (later Women's College Hospital) 
 John Colapinto — New Yorker staff writer, author of the novel About the Author (2001) and the New York Times bestselling nonfiction book As Nature Made Him (2000). 
 Robertson Davies – Noted author
 Mike Eben – Hec Crighton Trophy recipient, three-time all-star wide receiver in the CFL, and radio and television narrator
 David Gilmour – Author and broadcast journalist
 Rev. Dr. Charles Gordon – Noted author
 Robert Sympson Jameson – Chief justice of the Dominica and Upper Canada, member of the Legislative Assembly of Upper Canada, Speaker of the Legislative Council of the Province of Canada, and Chief Superintendent of Education
 Stephen Leacock – Most widely read English-speaking author in the world 1910–1925
 Bruce Littlejohn – Internationally recognized photographer, writer, and conservationist
 J. P. M. B. "Jock" de Marbois – Appointee to the Légion d'honneur and Commodore of the Royal Navy and Royal Canadian Navy
 John McCaul – Theologian, second President of UofT, and President of the Canadian Institute (later the Royal Canadian Institute)
 James Alexander McClellan – President of the Educational Association of Ontario and education reformer
 Sir George Robert Parkin – Leader of the Imperial Federation League and First Secretary of the Rhodes Scholarship
 Sir Edward Robert Peacock – Receiver General to the Duchy of Cornwall and the Director of the Bank of England
 James Dodsley Humphreys – Toronto's "favourite tenor" and musical composer
 Henry Scadding – Canadian intellectual
 Arthur Sweatman – Archbishop of Toronto and Primate of the Anglican Church of Canada
 Arnold Walter – Austrian musician, founder of the Canadian Opera Company, and Director of Music at UofT
 Thomas Young – Architect, illustrator of early Toronto, and founding member of the Canadian Institute

Matriculation 
Between 2016 and 2022, UCC students matriculated at the following colleges and universities: Amherst College, Brown University, University of Cambridge, Columbia University, Cornell University, Duke University, University of Chicago, Dartmouth College, University of Edinburgh, Georgetown University, Harvard University, Johns Hopkins University, McGill University, Northwestern University, University of Notre Dame, University of Oxford, University of Pennsylvania, Princeton University, University of St Andrews, Stanford University, University of Toronto, University of Waterloo, Williams College, and Yale University.

UCC Association
The Upper Canada College Old Boys' Association is a non-profit organization established in 1891, on the day of the closure of the college's Russell Square campus. The name was changed in 1969 to the Upper Canada College Association, when the association expanded its mandate to include parents, faculty, staff and friends of the college in matters relating to UCC, such as governance and advancement. Specific programs are also run by the association, including those that permit recent graduates to volunteer as mentors to students, and Old Boy reunions are set up around the world by the association's fifteen branches outside of Toronto: Calgary, Halifax, Kingston, London, Montreal, Ottawa, and Vancouver in Canada; Boston, Los Angeles, New York City, and San Francisco in the United States; London in the United Kingdom; Hong Kong in China; and Budapest in Hungary.

A 29-person board of directors, referred to as the Association Council, meets three times a year to discuss matters facing the college and plan association events; 21 of those on the council are elected by members of the association at its annual meeting, while the remaining eight are ex officio. Four of the 17 members of the college's board of governors come from the association board, including the President of the Association, and serve on the larger body for a three-year period.

Arms, motto, and crest

The words, attached to the arms of Lord Nelson in 1797, were first used in relation to UCC in 1833, as part of an emblem stamped on the inside of books given as prizes, showing the phrase written on a ribbon tying together two laurel leaves around the school's name. Around 1850, a crown replaced the school's name; John Ross Robertson stated this was at the insistence of Henry Scadding, who argued in favour of its use because the school had both been founded by a lieutenant governor and was at first a royal grammar school. The crown originally used was that of King George IV.

In 1889, Scadding produced the design for the insignia which can still be seen over the doors to Laidlaw Hall at the college's Upper School. L.C. Kerslake described this crest in 1956:

The small wreath, crossed anchor and sword in the centre of the crest are found in Lord Nelson's coat of arms.
The open book in the upper left corner is symbolic of education which is the primary function of any school. The quadrant-shaped figure in the upper right corner is a section of the standard of St. George and signifies the school's connection with England and Great Britain, the native land of the founder, Lord Seaton.
Technically speaking, the crown should not be included in the crest, as the school was not instituted by royal charter. However, loyalty to the Crown is one of the fundamental traditions of UCC and is certain to endure as long as the school itself.
The cornua copiae just above the motto stands for the fullness of school life which is one of the distinctive marks of UCC.

This complex design, known as Scadding's Device, which was just the Seal of Upper Canada as authorised in 1820 with the college's motto and palm branches applied, was never widely used. Instead, the simple crown between laurel leaves tied with a ribbon bearing the school motto became the standard crest, though its appearance changed throughout the decades in reflection of current tastes.

It was not until the mid-1970s, as the college approached its sesquicentennial, that consideration was given to having the crest authorised by the College of Arms, then the heraldic authority for Canada, and the Armoral Bearings Committee was established to oversee the project. A petition was thereafter submitted to the Earl Marshal in 1981. The Board of Governors insisted that the school's traditional crest be incorporated into the forthcoming achievement; however, as the crest includes a royal crown, it was necessary to obtain the Canadian monarch's personal permission to use it officially. This was done via the Lieutenant Governor of Ontario, then John Black Aird (himself a UCC Old Boy), and Queen Elizabeth II consented to the request, making UCC the only institution of its kind in the Commonwealth of Nations to have the royal crown in its arms.

The letters patent granting UCC its armorial achievements, including a heraldic standard, were issued on 4 January 1985, the 155th anniversary of the college's first day of classes. The traditional crest became the school's badge. However, as text and figures are normally not included in such emblems, the motto was omitted, but the King of Arms made an exception to the rules by allowing the retention of the date 1829. The symbol also became the crest of the school's new arms, though here with the number 1829 also absent, since, per heraldic rules, the royal crown must sit directly on the helmet. The escutcheon of the arms shows two deer's heads in the chief—one being the crest of the arms of the Lord Seaton and the other taken from the arms of Bishop John Strachan, the first chairman of the board of governors—while, below a line of division embattled as in Seaton's achievement, is the aforementioned Scadding's Device surmounted by another royal crown. The shield is supported by, on the left, a master in academic gown and, at right, a student in cricket uniform, both styled on such figures in the mid-19th century. These devices were registered with the Canadian Heraldic Authority in 2005.

In media
In the 2006 film Bon Cop, Bad Cop, the main character of Martin Ward (Colm Feore) is a graduate of Upper Canada College. The school is also mentioned in Michael Ondaatje's In the Skin of a Lion as an institution into which the wealthy in Rosedale, Toronto, wished to enroll their eldest sons.

UCC was a filming location for the 1993 movie Searching for Bobby Fischer and was the focus of episode eight of season nine of the Rogers Television show Structures.

See also
 List of Canadian organizations with royal patronage
 Lower Canada College

References

External links

 
 Toronto Public Library: Catalogue for Upper Canada College
 Toronto Plaques: Upper Canada College
 The Queen's Own Rifles of Canada Regimental Museum and Archives: 1930s inspection of the UCC Cadet Corps (video)

 
Organizations based in Canada with royal patronage
Boys' schools in Canada
Boarding schools in Ontario
Private schools in Toronto
High schools in Toronto
Elementary schools in Toronto
Preparatory schools in Ontario
Educational institutions established in 1829
International Baccalaureate schools in Ontario
Member schools of the Headmasters' and Headmistresses' Conference
Clock towers in Canada
Terminating vistas in Canada
1829 establishments in Upper Canada